The 1991 NCAA Division II women's soccer tournament was the fourth annual NCAA-sponsored tournament to determine the team national champion of Division II women's college soccer in the United States.

The championship match was hosted at California State University, Dominguez Hills in Carson, California.

Hosts Cal State Dominguez Hills defeated defending champions Sonoma State in the final, 2–1, to claim the Toros' first national title.

Qualified teams

Bracket

See also 
1991 NCAA Division I Women's Soccer Tournament
NCAA Division III Women's Soccer Championship
1991 NCAA Division II Men's Soccer Championship
NAIA Women's Soccer Championship

References 

NCAA Division II Women's Soccer Championship
NCAA Division II Women's Soccer Tournament
NCAA Division II Women's Soccer Tournament
NCAA Division II Women's Soccer Tournament